The 1997 Challenge Cup, known as the Silk Cut Challenge Cup for sponsorship reasons, was the 96th staging of the Challenge Cup, a European rugby league cup competition.

The competition ended with the final on 3 May 1997, which was played at Wembley Stadium.

The trophy was won and successfully defended by St. Helens, who beat Bradford Bulls 32–22 in the final. The Lance Todd Trophy was won by Tommy Martyn.

First round

Second round

Third round

Fourth round

Fifth round

Quarter-finals

Semi-finals

Final

Teams
St Helens: Steve Prescott, Danny Arnold, Andy Haigh, Paul Newlove, Anthony Sullivan, Tommy Martyn, Bobbie Goulding, Apollo Perelini, Keiron Cunningham, Julian O'Neill, Chris Joynt, Derek McVey, Karle Hammond 
Subs: Vila Matautia, Chris Morley, Andy Northey, Ian Pickavance Coach: Shaun McRae

Bradford: Stuart Spruce, Abi Ekoku, Danny Peacock, Paul Loughlin, Paul Cook, Graeme Bradley, Robbie Paul, Brian McDermott, James Lowes, Tahi Reihana, Sonny Nickle, Bernard Dwyer, Steve McNamara
Subs: Glen Tomlinson, Paul Medley, Simon Knox, Matt Calland   Coach: Matthew Elliott

References

External links
Challenge Cup official website 

Challenge Cup
Challenge Cup
St Helens R.F.C.